Pirkkalan pyhät pihlajat (Finnish: The Holy Rowan Trees of Pirkkala) is a historical romance novel by the Finnish author Kaari Utrio, first published in 1976.

The novel is divided into six parts. The first part sets the historical background from AD 800 to 1250 for the location of the holy rowan trees of Pirkkala. The other five parts each have their own first person narrator (Filippa, Aleidis Ragvaldintytär, Kaarle Kustaanpoika, Barbara Catillina and Tuomas Haukka, respectively). The parts are divided into chapters and concentrate on years AD 1280–1282 with flashbacks to earlier times.

References

Notes

External links
 

Novels by Kaari Utrio
1976 novels
Tammi (company) books
20th-century Finnish novels
Finnish historical novels
Historical romance novels
Novels adapted into plays
Novels set in the 13th century